4-Hydroxyphenylpyruvic acid (4-HPPA) is an intermediate in the metabolism of the amino acid phenylalanine.  The aromatic side chain of phenylalanine is hydroxylated by the enzyme phenylalanine hydroxylase to form tyrosine.  The conversion from tyrosine to 4-HPPA is in turn catalyzed by tyrosine aminotransferase.  Additionally, 4-HPPA can be converted to homogentisic acid which is one of the precursors to ochronotic pigment.

It is an intermediary compound in the biosynthesis of scytonemin.

See also 
 4-Hydroxyphenylpyruvate dioxygenase

References 

Natural phenols
Phenols
Alpha-keto acids
Propionic acids
Hydroxy acids